Floréal was the eighth month in the French Republican calendar. The month was named after the Latin word flos, which means flower.

Floréal was the second month of the spring quarter (mois de printemps). It started 20 April or 21 April. It ended 19 May or 20 May. It follows the Germinal and precedes the Prairial.

Day name table 
Like all FRC months Floréal lasted 30 days and was divided into three 10-day weeks called décades (decades). Every day had the name of an agricultural plant, except the 5th (Quintidi) and 10th day (Decadi) of every decade, which had the name of a domestic animal (Quintidi) or an agricultural tool (Decadi).

Conversion table

Cultural references 
 British Sea Power reference Floréal in the chorus of Be Gone, from their album Open Season.
 Floréal-class frigate. These ships are named after the months of the French Republican calendar.

External links 
 Spring Quarter of Year II (facsimile)

French Republican calendar
April
May

sv:Franska revolutionskalendern#Månaderna